Navicula alaskana is a species of algae in the genus Navicula which occurs in Northern Alaska.

References

Further reading 
 

alaskana
Species described in 1961